The Museums + Heritage Show (aka Museums & Heritage Show) is an event in the museum and heritage sectors. The show is held annually and includes awards.

In 2017, the show is held at Olympia West, London, England, during May.

References

External links
 Museums + Heritage Show website

Year of establishment missing
Annual events in London
May events
Museum events
Heritage organisations in the United Kingdom